Nosebleed also known as an epistaxis, is the common occurrence of bleeding from the nose.

Nosebleed or similar may also refer to:

 Nosebleed section, the highest seats of a public arena
 Ed Banger and The Nosebleeds aka The Nosebleeds, a British punk rock band of the 1970s
 Nosebleed, a Jackie Chan film which was cancelled because of the September 11 attacks
 Achillea millefolium, or common yarrow, also called the nosebleed plant for its astringent properties
 Nosebleed stakes, the highest stakes offered in poker, generally in reference to games $200/$400 or higher